Nationality words link to articles with information on the nation's poetry or literature (for instance, Irish or France).

Events
 April – English poet Ben Jonson visits Scottish poet William Drummond of Hawthornden.
 c. October – Following the death of Samuel Daniel, Ben Jonson becomes Poet Laureate of the Kingdom of England (on Johnson's death in 1637 he is succeeded by William Davenant).
 Martin Opitz becomes the leader of the school of young poets in Heidelberg.

Works published
 Richard Braithwaite, writing under the pen name "Musophilus", A New Spring Shadowed in Sundry Pithie Poems
 Sir John Davies, Nosce Teipsum (see also Nosce Teipsum 1599, 1622)
 Michael Drayton, Idea
 Henry Hutton, Follie's Anatomie; or, Satyres and Satiricall Epigrams
 George Wither, Fidelia

Births
Death years link to the corresponding "[year] in poetry" article:
 January 21 – Anders Bording (died 1677), Danish poet and journalist
 March 6 – Cyrano de Bergerac (died 1655), French soldier and poet
 Moses Belmonte (died 1647), Spanish polyglot poet and translator
 Bedřich Bridel (died 1680), Czech baroque writer, poet and missionary
 William Chamberlayne (died 1703), English poet, playwright, physician and Royalist soldier
 Morgan Llwyd (died 1659), Welsh Puritan preacher, poet and prose writer
 Shalom Shabazi (died 1720), Jewish poet of Yemen

Deaths
Birth years link to the corresponding "[year] in poetry" article:
 April 21 – Shlomo Ephraim Luntschitz (born 1550), Polish rabbi, poet and Torah commentator
 October 14 – Samuel Daniel (born 1562), English Poet Laureate and historian
 Frei Agostinho da Cruz (born 1540), brother of Diogo Bernardes, Portuguese
 Probable year – Ginés Pérez de Hita (born 1544), Spanish novelist and poet

See also

 Poetry
 17th century in poetry
 17th century in literature

Notes

17th-century poetry
Poetry